Internet-in-a-Box is a low-cost digital library, consisting of a wireless access point with storage, which users nearby can connect to.

Internet in a Box may also refer to:

 IBox, an Internet connection software packages
 Internet in a Suitcase, an open-source wireless mesh network for electronic communication

See also 
 Network-In-a-Box